Andrew James Taylor (born 16 February 1961) is an English guitarist, best known as a former member of both Duran Duran and the Power Station. He has also recorded and performed as a solo artist, and served as a guitarist, songwriter, and record producer for the likes of Robert Palmer, Rod Stewart, the Almighty, Thunder, Love and Money, Mark Shaw, Then Jerico, C. C. Catch, Paul Rodgers (with The Law), Belinda Carlisle, and Gun.

History

Background / early musical career
Andrew Taylor was born in Tynemouth and raised in the town of Cullercoats, Northumberland in northeast England, and attended Marden High School. He began playing guitar at the age of eleven and was soon playing with local bands, even producing one at the age of 16. He received guitar tuition from Dave Black, a member of the short-lived, post-David Bowie version of Bowie's sometime backing band the Spiders from Mars.  He dropped out of school early to tour England and Europe with several different bands, playing working men's clubs and air force bases. Then in April 1980, as Taylor puts it, "I made that fateful train journey down to Birmingham."

Duran Duran
Duran Duran began their rise to fame at a Birmingham club named the "Rum Runner". The club was owned by their managers and mentors, brothers Paul and Michael Berrow. It was centred on the music and ostentatious fashion of the era, particularly house and disco music, which had fused with punk and electronic to create the sound and look adopted by various "New Romantic" acts of the time. The band was heavily influenced by the 12-inch cuts of the day. Taylor says... "Anybody who is familiar with early DD (Duran Duran) will be aware of the Night Versions concept… the underlying influence of the 12-inch mix – Edwards & Rodgers – Giorgio Moroder ... It was all part of the matrix – we tested our first hits on the dance floor before going anywhere near the radio – it was the way you defined your style and who you were, through the club you were associated with – where you hung-out ... I'm a rock fan, but the girls hung out at the disco – I recommend a large portion of both."

The band signed to EMI Records in December 1980, only seven months after completing their line-up. Their debut single "Planet Earth" was released shortly after that, with their self-titled debut album, Duran Duran, released in June 1981. By 1983, the band was a global success story.

Power Station and Robert Palmer
While Duran Duran were on hiatus in 1985, Andy Taylor and bassist John Taylor joined renowned session drummer and former Chic member Tony Thompson and Robert Palmer to form the band Power Station. Their eponymous album, recorded mostly at the New York studio after which the band was named, reached the top 20 in the UK and the top 10 in the US, and spawned two hit singles with "Some Like It Hot" (UK number 14, US number 6) and a cover of the T. Rex song "Get It On (Bang a Gong)" (UK number 22, US number 9). Palmer performed live with the band only once that year, on Saturday Night Live. The band toured, and even played Live Aid with singer Michael Des Barres after Palmer bowed out at the last moment to go back into the studio to further his newly revitalised solo career. Taylor also performed with Duran Duran at the Live Aid event.

Palmer recorded the album Riptide in 1985, recruiting Thompson and Andy Taylor to play on some tracks and Power Station producer Bernard Edwards, who worked with Thompson in the group Chic, to helm the production. Robert recruited Wally Badarou, another Compass Point Star, who had laid synthesizer tracks on the Power Station album, plus his long-term drummer, Dony Wynn, for this production, as well.

Taylor said: "I don't think any of us could have known at the time that this little venture would lead to the breakup of DD,  but it did or at least it exposed the cracks in the pavement. I think we were all surprised at the amount of success the project achieved, particularly Robert, whose career was reignited in the USA. It was an extraordinary time, everything we were associated with just flew off the shelves. As well as being the opportunity to express a major musical statement, I guess it was also as much of a statement against the label demands."

Solo and production
After six years of being a member of Duran Duran, Taylor had realised both the band and he were in freefall. He and the other bandmembers rarely spoke to one another and the band were now living on three different continents. Taylor himself was now based in Los Angeles, where he met with ex-Sex Pistols guitarist Steve Jones and they began collaborating for Taylor's forthcoming solo album.

In the meantime, he recorded the hit single "Take It Easy" (US number24), which was recorded as the theme song to the movie American Anthem. Ex-Missing Persons members Terry Bozzio and Patrick O'Hearn performed drums and bass, respectively, on the song and video. Two other songs by Taylor and Jones also appeared on the album: "Wings of Love" and the instrumental "Angel Eyes". Taylor also contributed to the Miami Vice II soundtrack with the song "When the Rain Comes Down" (US number 43), as well as making an appearance on said show with Power Station in 1985, season two, episode three titled "Whatever Works". It was followed by his first solo album, Thunder (1987). O'Hearn again played bass for him on the album and during the following tour. Also on the Thunder world tour were guitarist Paul Hanson (guitarist) and drummer John Valen. Hanson, Valen and O'Hearn also appeared with Taylor in the music video for the second single from the Thunder album, "Don't Let Me Die Young". Despite moderate success in the US, Taylor's solo material failed to catch on in his native UK.

Throughout 1987 and 1988, Taylor co-wrote and co-produced Rod Stewart's multi-platinum album Out of Order along with Chic members Bernard Edwards and Tony Thompson (the latter of whom had also performed with him in Power Station), spawning the Billboard hits, "Lost in You", "Forever Young", and "My Heart Can't Tell You No".

Taylor also contributed a cover of "Dead on the Money" to the Tequila Sunrise soundtrack in 1988. (Taylor's former band Duran Duran also allowed one of their own songs, "Do You Believe in Shame?", to be included on the album.) A second solo album, consisting of entirely cover versions, entitled Dangerous, was released in 1990.

Taylor then moved on to producing full time, working with several successful UK bands throughout the 1990s. He produced the debut album Back Street Symphony by London rockers Thunder and their follow up Laughing on Judgement Day. It was followed by the Almighty album Soul Destruction, and then Mark Shaw's album Almost. Taylor based himself in his now refurbished Trident Studios in London with then manager and partner Rob Hallett, until 1994, when he returned to Los Angeles to write and produce tracks for a second Power Station album and the 1995 Rod Stewart album A Spanner in the Works.

Reunions
Taylor participated in the 1994 reunion of Power Station. They recorded a second album Living in Fear for EMI. During the course of this album, Bernard Edwards died in his hotel room after a Chic gig in Tokyo. The band were shellshocked at his sudden death, but vowed to continue as a trio and complete the project. They subsequently finished the album with Canadian engineer/producer Mike Fraser, with a Japanese and US tours to follow to promote the record.

In 2000, Taylor reunited with the other original members of Duran Duran to record their first new music together since 1985. The band secured a new recording contract with Sony Records. Their ensuing album, 2004 Astronaut, featured a blend of Taylor's heavy guitar with the synth hooks of the classic Duran Duran sound. The first single, "(Reach Up for The) Sunrise", reached number five in the UK, and the album reached number three (number 17 in the US).

Months prior to the album's release, the band played their largest-ever UK tour in the spring of 2004, which was followed by a world tour in 2005, including Asia, Europe, South America, and North America. The band also performed at Live 8.

In 2006, whilst recording a new Duran Duran album, Taylor once again parted ways with the band. The subsequent album, titled Reportage, was scrapped by the band after his departure. More recently, Taylor strongly hinted in his blogs that Duran Duran's management company were partly responsible for his departure. This was confirmed when The Sunday Times (UK) printed a retraction on 4 May 2008.

A short controversy followed as Taylor wrote in his 2008 autobiography that there was no "blunt message" and that in addition to the problems of writing and recording Reportage, old conflicts between other band members and himself had resurfaced. The other band members have maintained their version, in which Andy Taylor's chronic unexplainable absences are pointed out. The band issued a statement in the wake of his departure, stating they "will be continuing as Duran Duran without Andy, as we have reached a point in our relationship with him where there is an unworkable gulf between us and we can no longer effectively function together".

In 2019, Andy ended his 10-year hiatus from music and started to tour again, releasing a new single.

After touring with British rock band Reef in 2020, Taylor went on to produce their new album Shoot Me Your Ace, due to be released in April 2022.

RockAffairs
In November 2007, Taylor co-founded RockAffairs.com alongside Sarah Eaglesfield, the former Flightside vocalist and webmistress at duranduran.com. RockAffairs was developed to allow unsigned artists to sell MP3s and merchandise, promote their band, and keep 100% of the profit. It also pioneered a maverick profit share scheme where 100% of income from listener signups was distributed amongst bands who sign up for the scheme.

In June 2008, Taylor handed control of the website over to Eaglesfield. As of 2017, Taylor remains the owner of RockAffairs Ltd in the UK. Rockaffairs has announced it will be returning for one week of special 10th-anniversary broadcasts during summer 2018.

Autobiography
In 2008, Taylor published an autobiography, Wild Boy: My Life in Duran Duran, in which he tells his life's story from youth in an extended family to his life with wife Tracey. The book aims to give a backstage look on Duran Duran's rise and a survey of the band's career album by album, as well as of Taylor's solo works and collaborations. It also deals with the iconic status of Duran Duran in the time of early MTV and the band's issues with drugs and alcohol.

Personal life 
In 2022, Taylor stated that he has been married to his wife Tracey for 40 years. They have four children. The couple currently reside in Ibiza, Spain.

When Duran Duran were inducted into the Rock and Roll Hall of Fame in 2022, Taylor was unable to attend the ceremony. During the event, Simon Le Bon read part of a letter that Taylor had written revealing he had been diagnosed with stage 4 metastatic prostate cancer four years prior, and a recent setback kept him from attending. The letter was posted to the band's website later, in which Taylor said his condition is incurable, but not immediately life threatening.

Discography

Studio albums

Unreleased albums
 Nobody's Business (1989)

Extended plays
 The Spanish Sessions (1999, with Luke Morley)

with Duran Duran
 Duran Duran (1981)
 Rio (1982)
 Seven and the Ragged Tiger (1983)
 Arena (1984)
 Notorious (1986)
 Astronaut (2004)
 Reportage (unreleased)

with Power Station
 The Power Station (1985)
 Living in Fear (1996)

with Rod Stewart
 Out of Order (1988)
 A Spanner in the Works (1995)

Singles

Guest appearances
 Lead guitar on "Addicted to Love" (from the Robert Palmer album, Riptide) (1985)
 Lead guitar on "Mad About You" (from the Belinda Carlisle album, Belinda) (1986)

Soundtrack appearances
 "Take It Easy", "Wings of Love", "Angel Eyes" (from American Anthem) (1986)
 "When the Rain Comes Down" (from Miami Vice) (1986)
 "Dead on the Money" (from Tequila Sunrise) (1988)

Bibliography

See also
 Bands and musicians from Yorkshire and North East England

References

Further reading

External links 

 
 
 
 Andy Taylor interview on Stuck in the '80s podcast

1961 births
Living people
English rock guitarists
English male singer-songwriters
English new wave musicians
British synth-pop new wave musicians
English record producers
Duran Duran members
The Power Station (band) members
Ivor Novello Award winners
English male guitarists
People from Tynemouth
People from Cullercoats
Musicians from Tyne and Wear